Newstead may refer to:

Australia 
Newstead, Queensland, a suburb of Brisbane
Newstead, Tasmania, a suburb of Launceston
Newstead, Victoria, a town

Canada 
Newstead, Newfoundland and Labrador

New Zealand 

 Newstead, Waikato

Sri Lanka 
Newstead Girls College, a school in Negombo

United Kingdom 
Newstead, North Lincolnshire, a former civil parish, now in Cadney
Newstead-on-Ancholme Priory
Newstead, Northumberland, in Adderstone with Lucker
Newstead, Nottinghamshire, England
Newstead Abbey (ancestral home of Lord Byron)
Newstead, Scottish Borders, the site of the Roman fort at Trimontium
Newstead, South Kesteven, in Uffington, Lincolnshire, England
Newstead Priory
Newstead Wood School, a grammar school for girls in Orpington, Greater London, England

United States 
Newstead, Kentucky, an unincorporated community
Newstead, New York, a town